The 2022–23 London Lions season is the 46th season of the franchise in the British Basketball League (BBL), and their 11th under the banner of London Lions.

This season will be their first under the leadership of their new head coach Ryan Schmidt, and their first season in the EuroCup Basketball competition.

Roster

Standings

Ladder 

The BBL tie-breaker system as outlined in the BBL Rules and Regulations states that in the case of an identical win–loss record, the results in games played between the teams will determine order of seeding.

EuroCup ladder

Game log

BBL Championships 

|-style="background:#BBF3BB;"
| 1
| 23 September
| @ Sheffield
| W 73–86
| Sam Dekker (23)
| Kosta Koufos (8)
| Ovie Soko (5)
| Ponds Forge1,000
| 1–0
|-style="background:#BBF3BB;"
| 2
| 30 September
| Leicester
| W 89–78
| Tomislav Zubčić (20)
| Sam Dekker (11)
| Luke Nelson (8)
| Copper Box Arenanot available
| 2–0

|-style="background:#BBF3BB;"
| 3
| 5 October
| Caledonia
| W 95–87
| Sam Dekker (30)
| Sam Dekker (8)
| Queeley, van Oostrum (4)
| Copper Box Arenanot available
| 3–0
|-style="background:#BBF3BB;"
| 4
| 7 October
| @ Newcastle
| W 72–85
| Sam Dekker (15)
| Josh Sharma (8)
| Luke Nelson (5)
| Vertu Motors Arenanot available
| 4–0
|-style="background:#BBF3BB;"
| 5
| 15 October
| @ Surrey
| W 64–83
| Luke Nelson (18)
| Nelson, Sharma, Zubčić (6)
| Luke Nelson (5)
| Surrey Sports Park1,000
| 5–0
|-style="background:#BBF3BB;"
| 6
| 21 October
| Cheshire
| W 75–60
| Vojtěch Hruban (17)
| Devon van Oostrum (6)
| Luke Nelson (4)
| Copper Box Arenanot available
| 6–0
|-style="background:#BBF3BB;"
| 7
| 23 October
| Manchester
| W 91–83
| Tomislav Zubčić (22)
| Kosta Koufos (9)
| Devon van Oostrum (7)
| Copper Box Arenanot available
| 7–0
|-style="background:#FFBBBB;"
| 8
| 28 October
| @ Sheffield
| L 87–81
| Tomislav Zubčić (25)
| Kosta Koufos (14)
| Aaron Best (6)
| Ponds Forge300
| 7–1

|-style="background:#FFBBBB;"
| 9
| 6 November
| @ Bristol
| L 75–71
| Sam Dekker (28)
| Kosta Koufos (10)
| Luke Nelson (4)
| SGS College Arena800
| 7–2

|-style="background:#BBF3BB;"
| 10
| 1 December
| Manchester
| W 95–71
| Josh Sharma (28)
| Joshua Ward-Hibbert (9)
| Luke Nelson (11)
| Copper Box Arena750
| 8–2
|-style="background:#BBF3BB;"
| 11
| 11 December
| @ Cheshire
| W 74–89
| Ovie Soko (12)
| Kosta Koufos (11)
| Nelson, Soluade (5)
| Cheshire Oaks Arena1,100
| 9–2
|-style="background:#BBF3BB;"
| 12
| 16 December
| Bristol
| W 95–60
| Sam Dekker (25)
| Kosta Koufos (11)
| Dekker, Soluade (5)
| Copper Box Arenanot available
| 10–2
|-style="background:#BBF3BB;"
| 13
| 27 December
| @ Leicester
| W 75–81
| Sam Dekker (21)
| Kosta Koufos (14)
| Jordan Taylor (10)
| Morningside Arena666
| 11–2
|-style="background:#BBF3BB;"
| 14
| 30 December
| Plymouth
| W 87–63
| Luke Nelson (19)
| Joshua Ward-Hibbert (12)
| Jordan Taylor (6)
| Copper Box Arena3,000
| 12–2

|-style="background:#BBF3BB;"
| 15
| 8 January 
| @ Caledonia
| W 60–84 
| Aaron Best (15)
| Josh Sharma (10)
| Luke Nelson (6)
| Emirates Arena900
| 13–2
|-style="background:#BBF3BB;"
| 16
| 20 January
| @ Surrey
| W 67–88
| Aaron Best (18)
| Joshua Ward-Hibbert (7)
| Morayo Soluade (5)
| Surrey Sports Park1,000
| 14–2
|-style="background:#BBF3BB;"
| 17
| 22 January 
| Sheffield
| W 75–63
| Aaron Best (18)
| Komagum, Koufos (9)
| Dekker, Soluade (4)
| Copper Box Arena4,382
| 15–2
|-style="background:#BBF3BB;"
| 18
| 26 January 
| Cheshire
| W 89–79
| Tomislav Zubčić (19)
| Sam Dekker (8)
| Jordan Taylor (7)
| Copper Box Arena964
| 16–2

|-style="background:#BBF3BB;"
| 19
| 5 February 
| @ Plymouth
| W 79–88
| Tomislav Zubčić (21)
| Ovie Soko (8)
| Tomislav Zubčić (8)
| Plymouth Pavilionsnot available
| 17–2
|-style="background:#BBF3BB;"
| 20
| 12 February 
| @ Cheshire
| W 65–86
| Luke Nelson (21)
| Josh Sharma (12)
| Luke Nelson (9)
| Cheshire Oaks Arena1,200
| 18–2
|-style="background:#BBF3BB;"
| 21
| 14 February 
| Surrey
| W 88–62
| Vojtěch Hruban (18)
| Tomislav Zubčić (7)
| Luke Nelson (9)
| Copper Box Arena2,402
| 19–2
|-style="background:#BBF3BB;"
| 22
| 19 February 
| Bristol
| W 82–64
| Koufos, Nelson (18)
| Kosta Koufos (11)
| Jordan Taylor (5)
| Copper Box Arena3,410
| 20–2

|-style="background:#BBF3BB;"
| 23
| 3 March 
| @ Leicester
| W 77–102
| Sam Dekker (18)
| Jonathan Komagum (8)
| Jordan Taylor (7)
| Morningside Arenanot available
| 21–2
|-style="background:#BBF3BB;"
| 24
| 5 March
| Caledonia
| W 99–67
| Vojtěch Hruban (21)
| Oni, Sharma (6)
| Jordan Taylor (6)
| Copper Box Arena3,500
| 22–2
|-style="background:#BBF3BB;"
| 25
| 10 March
| @ Manchester
| W 76–87
| Sam Dekker (18)
| Miye Oni (10)
| Jordan Taylor (4)
| National Basketball Centrenot available
| 23–2
|-style="background:#BBF3BB;"
| 26
| 12 March
| @ Plymouth
| W 51–102
| Sam Dekker (18)
| Joshua Ward-Hibbert (8)
| Sam Dekker (8)
| Plymouth Pavilions1,000
| 24–2
|-style="background:#BBF3BB;"
| 27
| 17 March
| @ Newcastle
| W 85–88
| Sam Dekker (17)
| Josh Sharma (5)
| Jordan Taylor (7)
| Vertu Motors Arena3,000
| 25–2
|-style="background:#FFBBBB;"
| 28
| 19 March
| Sheffield
| L 80–82
| Sam Dekker (24)
| Miye Oni (8)
| Hruban, Soluade, Taylor, Zubčić (3)
| Copper Box Arena2,663
| 25–3
|-style="background:#;"
| 29
| 23 March
| Newcastle
| boxscore
| 
| 
| 
| Copper Box Arena
|
|-style="background:#;"
| 30
| 31 March
| Surrey
| boxscore
| 
| 
| 
| Copper Box Arena
| 

|-style="background:#;"
| 31
| 2 April 
| @ Bristol
| boxscore
|
|
|
| SGS College Arena
|
|-style="background:#;"
| 32
| 7 April
| Leicester
| boxscore
|
|
|
| Copper Box Arena
|
|-style="background:#;"
| 33
| 9 April
| @  Manchester
| boxscore
|
|
|
| National Basketball Centre
|
|-style="background:#;"
| 34
| 16 April
| Newcastle
| boxscore
|
|
|
| Copper Box Arena
|
|-style="background:#;"
| 35
| 21 April
| Plymouth
| boxscore
|
|
|
| Copper Box Arena
|
|-style="background:#;"
| 36
| 23 April
| @ Caledonia
| boxscore
|
|
|
| Emirates Arena
|

EuroCup 

|-style="background:#FFBBBB;"
| 1
| 12 October
| @ Hapoel Tel Aviv
| L 76–59
| Tomislav Zubčić (21)
| Kosta Koufos (10)
| Devon van Oostrum (5)
| Drive in Arena3,514
| 0–1
|-style="background:#BBF3BB;"
| 2
| 19 October
| Trento
| W 80–75
| Ovie Soko (22)
| Ovie Soko (14)
| Hruban, Nelson (4)
| Copper Box Arena2,183
| 1–1
|-style="background:#FFBBBB;"
| 3
| 26 October
| @ Gran Canaria
| L 87–69
| Vojtěch Hruban (18)
| Ovie Soko (9)
| Ovie Soko (5)
| Gran Canaria Arena2,411
| 1–2

|-style="background:#FFBBBB;"
| 4
| 2 November
| Budućnost
| L 78–87
| Best, Dekker (15)
| Josh Sharma (6)
| Sam Dekker (6)
| Wembley Arena1,791
| 1–3
|-style="background:#BBF3BB;"
| 5
| 23 November
| @ Hamburg
| W 75–103
| Tomislav Zubčić (22)
| Sam Dekker (7)
| Oni, Soluade (6)
| Edel-optics.de Arena1,688
| 2–3
|-style="background:#BBF3BB;"
| 6
| 30 November
| Wrocław
| W 97–80
| Sam Dekker (18)
| Koufos, Soko (6)
| Luke Nelson (6)
| Copper Box Arena1,801
| 3–3

|-style="background:#BBF3BB;"
| 7
| 7 December
| @ Patras
| W 67–77
| Sam Dekker (20)
| Kosta Koufos (9)
| Luke Nelson (4)
| Dimitris Tofalos Arena507
| 4–3
|-style="background:#FFBBBB;"
| 8
| 15 December
| @ Türk Telekom
| L 102–74
| Sam Dekker (20)
| Dekker, Koufos (7)
| Sam Dekker (6)
| Ankara Spor Salonu6,137
| 4–4
|-style="background:#FFBBBB;"
| 9
| 22 December
| Paris
| L 80–93
| Sam Dekker (19)
| Kosta Koufos (10)
| Jordan Taylor (9)
| Copper Box Arena5,297
| 4–5

|-style="background:#FFBBBB;"
| 10
| 11 January
| Hapoel Tel Aviv
| L 93–95
| Sam Dekker (29)
| Kosta Koufos (9)
| Jordan Taylor (9)
| Wembley Arena2,907
| 4–6
|-style="background:#BBF3BB;"
| 11
| 19 January
| @ Trento
| W 70–84
| Sam Dekker (23)
| Dekker, Koufos (10)
| Jordan Taylor (8)
| Blm Group Arena1,389
| 5–6
|-style="background:#FFBBBB;"
| 12
| 25 January
| Gran Canaria
| L 57–60
| Sam Dekker (18)
| Kosta Koufos (11)
| Jordan Taylor (5)
| Copper Box Arena2,306
| 5–7

|-style="background:#FFBBBB;"
| 13
| 2 February
| @ Budućnost
| L 78–68
| Sam Dekker (27)
| Sam Dekker (8)
| Jordan Taylor (4)
| Morača Sports Center1,515
| 5–8
|-style="background:#BBF3BB;"
| 14
| 9 February
| Hamburg
| W 83–66
| Kosta Koufos (17)
| Kosta Koufos (11)
| Dekker, Hruban (4)
| Copper Box Arena3,813
| 6–8

|-style="background:#BBF3BB;"
| 15
| 9 March
| @ Wrocław
| W 76–83
| Jordan Taylor (23)
| Miye Oni (12)
| Miye Oni (4)
| Centennial Hall2,146
| 7–8
|-style="background:#FFBBBB;"
| 16
| 16 March
| Patras
| L 89–93
| Tomislav Zubčić (24)
| Sharma, Zubčić (9)
| Miye Oni (5)
| Copper Box Arena2,470
| 7–9
|-style="background:#;"
| 17
| 22 March
| Türk Telekom
| boxscore
|
|
|
| Copper Box Arena
|
|-style="background:#;"
| 18
| 30 March
| @ Paris
| boxscore
|
|
|
| Halle Georges Carpentier
|

BBL Cup 

|-style="background:#BBF3BB;"
| 1
| 26 November
| Cheshire
| W 74–65
| Hruban, Nelson (12)
| Komagum, Koufos, Ward-Hibbert (6)
| Nelson, Oni (4)
| Copper Box Arena1,500
| 1–0

|-style="background:#BBF3BB;"
| 2
| 19 December
| @ Bristol
| W 79–97
| Kosta Koufos (24)
| Kosta Koufos (7)
| Jordan Taylor (6)
| SGS College Arena770
| 2–0

|-style="background:#BBF3BB;"
| 3
| 29 January
| @ Leicester
| W 71–79
| Sam Dekker (22)
| Kosta Koufos (12)
| Jordan Taylor (4)
| Utilita Arena Birminghamnot available
| 3–0

BBL Trophy 

|-style="background:#BBF3BB;"
| 1
| 12 January
| Worthing
| W 89–53
| Aaron Best (24)
| Komagum, Ward-Hibbert (13)
| Luke Nelson (7)
| Copper Box Arenanot available
| 1–0

|-style="background:#FFBBBB;"
| 2
| 10 February
| @ Caledonia
| L 52–50
| Joshua Ward-Hibbert (14)
| Joshua Ward-Hibbert (8)
| Luke Nelson (4)
| Emirates Arena500
| 1–1

Transactions

Re-signed

Additions

Subtractions

See also 
 2022–23 British Basketball League season
 London Lions

References

External links 
London Lions (official website)
British Basketball League

London Lions
London Lions season
London Lions season
London Lions season